Wyoming Highway 341 (WYO 341) is  Wyoming State Road located in eastern Sheridan County and is a spur from US 14/US 16 to the community of Arvada.

Route description

Wyoming Highway 341 starts its southern end in the community of Arvada near Sheridan County Route 38 (Wild Horse Road) and Sheridan County Route 273 (Upper Powder River Road). WYO 341 actually begins just short of the Arvada city limits. Highway 341 travels north, perpendicular to the Burlington Northern & Santa Fe Railroad before crossing it. WYO 341 ends at just under 3.2 miles at US 14/US 16 three miles north of Arvada.

Major intersections

See also

References

External links 

 Wyoming State Routes 300-399
 Wyoming Highway 341 - US 14/US  16 to Arvada

Transportation in Sheridan County, Wyoming
341